A queen carnival was a type of fundraising event that was popular in New Zealand and Australia during the early 20th century. They were particularly common during World War I and in the years after, when they were used to raise funds for returned soldiers. The first such carnival is believed to have been held in Napier, New Zealand, in 1913. The carnivals were not always annual events, and were held in various locations throughout a year.

1913 Napier Mardi Gras
The first time the popular election of the Queen of the Carnival was used as fundraiser was at the 1913 Napier Mardi Gras. One report said the contest was for a "Queen of Beauty" and the public would choose from photographs of the entrants with names remaining secret. There were 13 candidates .  A vote cost twopence and with 62580 votes cast  over £500 was raised.

As the Queen would reign over the revels, wit, personality, majesty and a talent for theatre would be of advantage and the election of Mrs J. A. Rosewarne proved a success, although one newspaper did think the Queen of Carnival  should be unmarried.
Mrs Rosewarne was also called Napier's Queen of Song and was principal soprano at a pre-festival performance of the Messiah. 
The Mardi Gras was a triumphant success and the Queen, as part of the theatre of the event, bestowed honours on a number of the Napier burghers and made the organiser of the carnival, John Hopkins, a KCMG or Knight Commander Mardi Gras.

One newspaper devoted a page to pictures of the carnival and a film was made for screening at picture 
theatres.

Inaugurated by the Napier Thirty Thousand Club to raise money for town beautification, the Mardi Gras became an annual event which John Hopkins continued to organise. The war changed priorities and in 1914 the proceeds went to the Belgian Relief Fund and in 1915 to the Wounded Soldiers Fund. .

The carnival  became a model for other Carnivals in New Zealand and John Hopkins was approached to help with the upcoming Wanganui carnival

William Lints
William Lints (aka William Lintz) was born in Aberdeen, Scotland on 14 December 1881. His parents were William and Helen Lints. The family first moved to Australia in 1882 where Lints was educated. In July 1893 the family emigrated to New Zealand and settled in Wanganui. Lints became a hairdresser and married Mabel Daisy Armstrong, the daughter of William and Sarah Armstrong, in 1902. In 1903 he became manager of the Central Hairdressing Saloon in New Plymouth. Lints established his own business, the Antiseptic Hairdressing Saloon in Devon Street East, New Plymouth. He was also a sportsman; instructing and doing gymnastics; playing hockey and water polo; swimming; and skating. As early as 1903, in Whanganui, he became involved in organising activities for the civic organisations he belonged to.

After creating the Queen Carnival concept, which he ran along with a revue called "Fete of nations" in 1914, Lints went on to direct large patriotic musical extravaganzas from 1916 to at least 1941. These included the "Battle of Bullion Hill" in 1916, the "Silver Bullet Cannoncade" in 1917, the revue called variously "Reveille", "Our Reveille", and "Reveille 1924" which ran from 1917 to the 1930s, and a 1941 revue called "Britannia". These revues were performed throughout New Zealand using Lints' own company supplemented by local performers from a variety of disciplines including ballet, opera, bands, and theatre.

Lints died in Wanganui at 91 years of age on 9 September 1973. His wife died in 1946 aged 62. She was born in 1883 in New Zealand.

Origin and purpose

Initially the Queen Carnivals were organised by William Lints of New Plymouth to raise funds for a variety of purposes, and during World War I particularly funds for the wounded soldiers returning home. During the inter war period Queen Carnivals were held to raise fund for worthy community causes.  Often funding sporting facilities or community buildings and services. The carnivals included elements of talent shows, fancy dress, sport and the sale of local produce, with a focus on electing a queen of the carnival. Votes were cast for each candidate and the winner was pronounced queen in a coronation ceremony at the end of the carnival.

Newspaper reports in 1914 indicated that they had been held in Whanganui and New Plymouth, with Feilding and Tauranga also considering holding them. After the Auckland carnival criticism was laid at Lints over the cost of the event and the lack of money going to the events beneficiaries. The lack of funds raised may have been Lints' initial inexperience as later events were reported as raising thousands of pounds. Certainly Lints received payment for his efforts.

In February 1915 Lints was reported as going to Bathurst and Albury in Australia to organise similar events, but was still in Nelson in March and reported as organising another in Gisborne in April. The Australian event occurred later that year. Queen Carnivals were held various towns and cities around the country.

Lints was advertising another carnival in Whanganui in October 1915 for commencement in December 1915. He followed this with a similar event in Nelson in 1916. The focus of these events had now become fund raising for returned soldiers.

It appears that even as early as 1915, individual towns and organisations were putting on their own Queen carnivals. The Queen Carnival tradition has been carried to other countries, including Fiji and Malta.

A time line with various Queen Carnivals

Popular culture 
 Bette and the Queen Carnival Turnley, J. -  , Random House Australia, 1990

References 

Historical events in New Zealand
Recurring events established in 1915